The St. Louis the King Cathedral Also San Luis Potosí Cathedral Is a Catholic cathedral that functions as the seat of the archdiocese of San Luis Potosí in Mexico. It is located in the historic center of the state capital, on the eastern side of the main square. The building we currently know was built in 1670 and was completed in 1730. It is a cathedral from 1854. It is dedicated to St. Louis King of France.

It has a Baroque façade designed as a screen, similar to the one of the Basilica of Guadalupe in Mexico City, has three bodies.

The main altar is composed of a large cypress made of masonry, of two bodies. In the first one is St. Louis King of France, the second shelters the image of Our Lady of the Expectation.

See also
Roman Catholicism in Mexico
St. Louis the King

References

Roman Catholic cathedrals in Mexico
Roman Catholic churches completed in 1730
San Luis Potosí City
Buildings and structures in San Luis Potosí
18th-century Roman Catholic church buildings in Mexico